The Shoroon Bumbagar tomb is an ancient tomb  in Zaamar sum, Tov Province, 160 km west of Ulaanbaatar, Mongolia about 2.5 km north-east from the banks of the Tuul River and close to the 10th-century Khitan town of Khermen Denzh on the banks of the Tuul River. It was built for a Turkic nobleman between 650 and 700 CE.

The tomb was discovered and excavated in 2011. It is a massive buried structure on the model of Tang dynasty tombs, which is 42 meters long, 1.8 meters wide and 7.5 meters deep. The monumental subterranean structure is characteristic of Northern Wei, Sui dynasty and Tang dynasty tombs, but not of contemporary Gök Türk tombs, which tend to be shallow and circular, forming a small elevated mound covered with rocks. The tomb of Shoroon Bumbagar was never looted and therefore was found to hold far more artifacts including an intact door, many statues and wall paintings of people, dragons and temples, although there was no inscription. 117 clay objects were discovered. About 50 Byzantine gold coins were also found in the tomb, which had been used as ornament rather than currency.

The tomb is an example of a Chinese-style Turkic memorial complex, dated to the second half of the 7th century CE, with Chinese architectural influence due to the control of the area by the Tang dynasty at that time. Chinese culture and military power had been dominant over the Turks, since the Turkic defeat under Illig Qaghan in the War of Yin-shan (630), marking the end of the Eastern Turkic Khaganate.

The Shoroon Bumbagar tomb is near and contemporary to the tomb of Pugu Yitu, a Turkic chief who was also a vassal of the Tang dynasty under the Jimi system, and died in 678 CE.

References

History of Mongolia
Archaeological sites in Mongolia
Göktürks
7th-century inscriptions